Initialized Capital is a venture capital fund founded in 2011 and headquartered in San Francisco. It was founded by Alexis Ohanian, Harjeet Taggar, and Garry Tan.

As of 2021, it has raised more than $3.2 billion in assets. Initialized Capital has 23 portfolio companies it invested in at seed that have since become unicorns, including Coinbase, Ro, Cruise Automation, Instacart, Flexport, Opendoor, Algolia, Goat Group, Rippling, Truepill, and CoinTracker.

History
Initialized raised $7 million in its first fund. In February 2012, it filed its Form D notice of exempt offering of securities. It raised $39 million in its second fund in August 2013.

In 2013, Initialized Capital became an early investor in Coinbase, wiring the cryptocurrency app's founder Brian Armstrong $200,000. Garry Tan left Y Combinator in 2015 to focus on Initialized full time.

On June 7, 2016, the firm announced a $100M target for its third fund and then closed $125 million.

In late 2018, it raised a $225 million fund, the company's fourth.

In June 2020, Ohanian ended his role as Managing Partner at Initialized.

In August 2020, the firm raised $230 million, the company's fifth round.

In December 2021, Initialized Capital completed its sixth funding round, raising $700 million to invest in startups.

In August 2022, it was announced that Garry Tan would be leaving to re-join Y Combinator as CEO. Jen Wolf and Brett Gibson have taken over leadership of the firm in Tan's absence.

Recognition
Garry Tan has been listed on the Forbes Midas List from 2018-2022.

See also
 Alexis Ohanian
 Garry Tan

References

Financial services companies established in 2011
Venture capital firms of the United States
2011 establishments in California